Gymnogelastis is a genus of moths of the Heliodinidae family.

Species
Gymnogelastis miranda  (Meyrick, 1913) (from New Guinea)

References

Heliodinidae